The Men's combined competition of the Albertville 1992 Olympics was held at Val d'Isère.

Luxembourg's Marc Girardelli was the defending World Cup combined champion.

Results

References 

Men's combined
Winter Olympics